Feevah (Dhivehi: ފީވައް) is one of the inhabited islands of Shaviyani Atoll administrative and geographically part of the Miladhummadulhu Atoll in the Maldives.

History
The island has had its fair share of natural disasters. Feevah was the southernmost island which was affected by the August 1815 earthquakes that shook the northernmost islands of the Maldives. The island was later severely damaged by the great cyclone of 1821. In modern history, the Boxing Day Tsunami of 2004 damaged the island and has affected agriculture on the island- the main occupation of its inhabitants.

Geography

Demography

References

Islands of the Maldives